The following list is a discography of production by American hip hop recording artist and record producer B.o.B. It includes a list of songs produced, co-produced and remixed by year, artist, album and title.

Singles produced 
2010
"Don't Let Me Fall" (B.o.B)
2011 
"I'll Be in the Sky" (B.o.B)
2012
"Am I a Psycho" (Tech N9ne featuring Hopsin & B.o.B)
"Where Are You (B.o.B vs. Bobby Ray)" (B.o.B)
"So Hard to Breathe" (B.o.B)

2002

Citty 
00. "I'm the Cookie Man"

2008

B.o.B - Hi! My Name Is B.o.B 
 02. "What the Fuck"
 17. "Don't Be Afraid"
 20. "Do Anything" (produced with Jim Jonsin)
 21. "One Day"
 30. "Better Off Alone"
 32. "They Keep Crying"
 33. "Just a Dream" 
 35. "Middle of the Day" (produced with Jim Jonsin)

B.o.B - Who the F#*k Is B.o.B? 
 03. "Generation Lost"
 04. "There It Is"
 05. "Double Bubble"
 07. "I'll Be in the Sky"
 08. "Service with a Smile"
 12. "East-Side Tales"
 16. "Lonely People" (produced with Jim Jonsin)
 Sample Credit: The Beatles - "Eleanor Rigby" 
 17. "Use Ur Love" (produced with Jim Jonsin)
 18. "Nigger"
 19. "Starship Strobelight" (produced with Jim Jonsin)

2009

B.o.B - B.o.B vs. Bobby Ray 
 06. "Do You Have the Stamina" (featuring Kanye West)
 Sample Credit: Kanye West - "Pinocchio Story" 
 10. "Voltage" (featuring Mickey Factz & Playboy Tre)
 12. "Satellite"
 14. "Mr. Bobby"
 15. "Trippin'"
 16. "Goodnite"
 17. "Camera"
 18. "No Man's Land"
 19. "Put Me On"
 20. "Already There"
 21. "Fly Like Me" (produced with Red Spyda)

Killer Mike - Underground Atlanta 
 04. "Generation Lost" (performed by B.o.B)

Rock City - PTFAO: Independence Day 
 08. "Do It Slow" (featuring B.o.B)

2010

Charles Hamilton 
 00. "Paperboy" (featuring B.o.B) (produced with Charles Hamilton, Woody and Kato)

B.o.B - May 25th 
 02. "Champion"
 05. "Out of Time"
 09. "The Rain"
 12. "Don't Feel So Good"
 13. "Cool Side"
 12. "Fools for Love" (featuring Charles Hamilton)

B.o.B - B.o.B Presents: The Adventures of Bobby Ray 
 01. "Don't Let Me Fall"
 03. "Past My Shades" (featuring Lupe Fiasco)
 05. "Ghost in the Machine"
 10. "Lovelier Than You"
 11. "5th Dimension" (featuring Ricco Barrino) (produced with T.I. & Lil' C)
 13. "Letters from Vietnam" (iTunes deluxe edition bonus track)

B.o.B - No Genre 
 08. "Cold as Ice" (produced with Mike Caren)
 09. "The Watchers"
 11. "American Dreamin'" (produced with Mike Caren)
 15. "Attraction"

2011

Tech N9ne - All 6's and 7's 
 03. "Am I A Psycho?" (featuring B.o.B & Hopsin)

B.o.B - E.P.I.C. (Every Play Is Crucial) 
 03. "Guest List" (featuring Roscoe Dash) (produced with Kutta)
 04. "What Are We Doing" (produced with Jim Jonsin)

Spodee - No Pressure 2 
 21. "Sunlight" (featuring Mitchelle'l and B.o.B) (produced with Lil' C)

2012

B.o.B - Strange Clouds 
 01. "Bombs Away" (featuring Morgan Freeman)
 02. "Ray Bands"
 03. "So Hard to Breathe"
 12. "Circles"
 15. "Where Are You (B.o.B vs. Bobby Ray)"
 17. "Back It Up for Bobby" (Bonus Track)
 18. "What Are We Doing" (produced with Jim Jonsin) (Bonus Track)
 19. "Guest List" (featuring Roscoe Dash) (produced with Kutta) (Bonus Track)

Waka Flocka Flame - Triple F Life: Friends, Fans & Family 
 07. "Fist Pump" (featuring B.o.B) (produced with Southside)

Iggy Azalea - Glory 
 03. "Runway" (featuring Pusha T)

B.o.B - Fuck 'Em We Ball 
 03. "Dynomite" (produced with Jamieson)
 07. "Be There" (produced with Jamieson)
 08. "Everythang" (produced with Osinachi)
 12. "Best Friend" (featuring Iggy Azalea & Mac Miller) (produced with Jamieson)
 14. "So Blowed" (featuring Snoop Lion)
 15. "Spend It"
 17. "Roll One Up"

2013

Hustle Gang - G.D.O.D. (Get Dough or Die) 
 09. "Problems" (featuring B.o.B, T.I., Mac Boney, Problem, Trae tha Truth & Young Dro)

Young Dro - Day Two 
 11. "Groupie" (featuring B.o.B & Trinidad James)

Doe B - Baby Jesus 
 05. "Hockey Bag" (featuring B.o.B)

Trae tha Truth - I Am King 
 01. "Intro"

B.o.B - Underground Luxury 
 03. "Paper Route"
 05. "Throwback" (featuring Chris Brown)
 06. "Back Me Up"
 09. "FlyMuthaFucka"
 12. "Cranberry Moon Walk" (featuring Mike Fresh) (produced with FKi and Big Zar)
 14. "Forever" (featuring Playboy Tre)

2014

B.o.B - No Genre Pt. 2
02. "Many Rivers"
06. Follow Me"
11. "Swing My Way" 
14. Chosen 
Leftover
00. "High as Hell"

Hustle Gang - G.D.O.D. II 
 13. "Champagne Room" (featuring Trey Songz, B.o.B, T.I., Big Kuntry King, Spodee)
 17. "Troubled" (featuring B.o.B, Watch The Duck, T.I., Dro)

Kevin Gates - Luca Brasi 2 
10. "Talk on Phones"

B.o.B - New Black 
02. "New Black"
03. "Generation Lost"
05. "Through My Head"
06. "Paper Route"
07. "Broken Bones"
08. "Provo King"

2016

B.o.B & Scotty ATL - We Got Tricked 
00. "We Got Tricked"

References
General

Specific

External links 
 
 
 

Discographies of American artists
Hip hop discographies
Production discographies